Jet Airliner is Modern Talking's first single from the fifth album Romantic Warriors. The single was released in Germany and in other European territories on May 18, 1987. "Jet Airliner" peaked at No. 7 in Germany on June 22, 1987, over one month after its release and spent four weeks within the top-10 and total of 11 weeks on the single chart. While the single managed to enter the top-10 in Austria, it entered the top-20 in Switzerland and Sweden, meanwhile charting moderately in the Netherlands where it peaked at No.33.

Track listing 
7" Single Hansa 109138 year 1987
 "Jet Airliner" - 4:16
 "Jet Airliner" (Instrumental) - 3:50

12" Maxi Hansa 609138 year 1987
 "Jet Airliner" (Fasten-Seat-Belt-Mix) - 5:53
 "Jet Airliner" (Instrumental) - 3:50
 "Jet Airliner" - 4:16

Chart position

References

External links

Modern Talking songs
1987 singles
Songs written by Dieter Bohlen